Ovesholm Castle is a manor house at Kristianstad Municipality in Scania, Sweden.

Carl Adam Wrangel (1748-1829), governor of Kristianstad, had the manor house built in 1792–1804. Count Axel Raoul Hamilton (1787-1875)  had an extension built in 1857.

See also
List of castles in Sweden

References

External links
Ovesholm website

 Buildings and structures in Skåne County